Courts of Metropolitan Magistrate are at the second lowest level of the Criminal Court structure in India According to the Section 16 of the Criminal Procedure Code, 1973 (CrPc),in every metropolitan area, there shall be established as many courts of Metropolitan Magistrates, and at such places, as the State Government may, after consultation with the High Court, by notification, specify. Metropolitan Courts are to be established at such places in every metropolitan area having population of ten lakh or more. It has jurisdiction throughout such metropolitan area. The presiding officers of such courts shall be appointed by the High Court.

A Metropolitan Magistrate is a first class magistrate under the general control of the District & Sessions Judge and is subordinate to the Chief Metropolitan Magistrate.

According to Section 29 of the CrPc., a Metropolitan Magistrate may pass a sentence of imprisonment for a term not exceeding three years, or of fine not exceeding ten thousand rupees.

Judiciary of India